Janne Lahtela (born 28 February 1974) is a Finnish former athlete, who established himself as one of the most dominant persons in the history of moguls skiing. He is currently the head coach of Japan's freestyle skiing team. He also is a key founder and sponsor for the IDOne ski company based out of Japan.

Lahtela was born in Kemijärvi. He won a gold medal in the moguls final of 2002 Winter Olympic Games. Four years earlier he had taken a silver medal in front of his cousin Sami Mustonen, who took bronze. He has also won the moguls skiing World Cup five times and became a World Champion in 1999.

References

External links
Official Homepage

1974 births
Living people
People from Kemijärvi
Finnish male freestyle skiers
Freestyle skiers at the 1992 Winter Olympics
Freestyle skiers at the 1994 Winter Olympics
Freestyle skiers at the 1998 Winter Olympics
Freestyle skiers at the 2002 Winter Olympics
Freestyle skiers at the 2006 Winter Olympics
Olympic freestyle skiers of Finland
Olympic gold medalists for Finland
Olympic silver medalists for Finland
Olympic medalists in freestyle skiing
Medalists at the 2002 Winter Olympics
Medalists at the 1998 Winter Olympics
Sportspeople from Lapland (Finland)